Saalbach-Hinterglemm is a municipality in the district of Zell am See (Pinzgau region), in the Austrian state of Salzburg.  It is well known for its skiing and other winter sports. A four piste network consisting of Saalbach, Hinterglemm, Fieberbrunn and Leogang is located in the municipality, adding up to 270 kilometers of ski slopes. It is short transfer to resort from Salzburg Airport.

Geography

Saalbach-Hinterglemm is located in the Pinzgau region, in the Saalbach Valley, which is oriented east-west. The region is a part of the Kitzbüheler Alpen. The highest point is Spielberghorn (2,044 m) in the north and Hochkogel (2,249 m) in the south.

The nearest large city is Zell am See, located about 20 km away. The municipality consists of two small towns: Saalbach and Hinterglemm, which each make up several Katastralgemeinden.

History
The oldest evidence of settlements in the municipality stems from 1222. The name Salpach first showed up in 1350. Before 1410 there was a church in the town. In 1489 archbishop Johann Beckensloer gave the town market rights.
 
In spite of this, Saalbach remained, for the most part, a poor agrarian community up into the 20th century.

In May 1945,  about 1000 men of  Jagdgeschwader 27 (JG 27) Afrika,  a World War II Luftwaffe Geschwader,  famous for service in the North African Campaign, supporting the Afrika Korps, marched here from their last base, in Salzburg, to  surrender to American troops that were occupying  the village. 

After the end of the war, tourists began arriving in the same 1945, and the village started to know a  lasting increase in prosperity. 
In 1987 Saalbach's name was changed to Saalbach-Hinterglemm.

Sports and recreation
The town of Saalbach is primarily orientated towards tourism, and many of the inhabitants' jobs are either directly or indirectly dependent on this industry.

Between 22 January and 3 February 1991, the FIS Alpine World Ski Championships took place in Saalbach-Hinterglemm.  It has also been the venue for the British University Snowsports Championships (BUSC) and the British Royal Air Force Championships on several occasions with great success.

Coat of arms
The municipality's coat of arms is described as A red shield with two diagonally-crossed golden skis. They are accompanied by a silver snowflake above them and three silver balls resting on top of each other at the bottom. On top of all this is an undulating silver bar.

Tourism

Skiing

Saalbach is one of Austria's premier ski resorts, offering a wide range of runs, extensive off piste, and an excellent snow record. Skiing can be found on both sides of the valley. The runs on the north side of the valley (south-facing side) tend to be preferred by visitors due to their sunny weather. The pistes on the south side of the valley (north-facing side) are normally in the shade, so have better snow cover, particularly in late season, as well as more trees. Much of the off piste skiing is found on the north side, where thigh-deep, untouched powder can be found only metres from many of the pistes. There is a small snowpark in Hinterglemm, but experienced snowboarders and skiers prefer to head to the snowpark in the adjacent valley in Leogang, which boasts superior kickers, as well as rails and jibs. Saalbach-Hinterglemm also features 6 and 8-man chairlifts with heated seats and retractable covers for use in bad weather.

See also
 Salzburgerland
 Salzburg

Notes

 Weal, John (2003). Jagdgeschwader 27 'Afrika'. Oxford: Osprey. .

External links

Official tourism website

Cities and towns in Zell am See District
Ski areas and resorts in Austria